Epiphractis aulica is a moth of the family Oecophoridae. This species was described from South Africa.
 
The wingspan is about 18 mm. The head and palpi are purplish-rosy sprinkled with whitish points and the face is whitish. The thorax is light ochreous-yellow, with the abdomen grey. The forewings are elongate, the costa moderately arched, ferruginous suffused with purplish-rosy and with an elongate light ochreous-yellow patch extending along the dorsum from the base to beyond the middle and reaching to the fold. The hindwings are grey, somewhat darker posteriorly.

References

Endemic moths of South Africa
Epiphractis
Moths described in 1912